White Downs may refer to
 Hackhurst and White Downs, a nature reserve in Surrey which is managed by the Surrey Wildlife Trust and is part of a Site of Special Scientific Interest
 Shire (Middle-earth) (White Downs), in  J. R. R. Tolkien's fictional Middle-earth